Liskeard Borough Police was the police force for the borough and corporate town of Liskeard, Cornwall, from 1853 to 1877. It was formed in the years following a riot at the Bullers Arms, which necessitated local police. It was amalgamated with Cornwall Constabulary in 1877. It only ever had two officers, Inspector Humphreys and Constable Spry.

References

Defunct police forces of England
1853 establishments in England
Organisations based in Cornwall
Crime in Cornwall
History of Cornwall
1877 disestablishments in the United Kingdom
Liskeard